Chris Patterson (born 6 September 1968) is an Irish professional rally racing co-driver.

Career
Patterson competed first time in the World Rally Championship (WRC) in 1993 and has won the 2006 Production World Rally Championship with Nasser Al-Attiyah. Patterson is recognised as one of the world's most experienced rally navigators. 29 June 2010 he joined Petter Solberg World Rally Team to replace Solberg's retired co-driver Phil Mills.

After Solberg switched to rallycross in 2013, Patterson was co-driving fellow Irishman Kris Meeke on a Citroën DS3 WRC in Rally Finland. They were running in fifth place on Meeke's WRC return before rolling in the final section of the penultimate stage of the rally. They also teamed up for Rally Australia, but again retired. In 2014, Patterson became Khalid Al Qassimi's co-driver.

Patterson is set to return to the championship with Gus Greensmith, driving for M-Sport Ford. This time under the Irish tricolour.

Complete rally results

Complete WRC results

* Season still in progress.

JWRC results

PWRC results

References

External links

 Chris Patterson's e-wrc profile

1968 births
Living people
British rally co-drivers
Motorsport people from Northern Ireland
Place of birth missing (living people)
World Rally Championship co-drivers